Kete Krachi is the capital of the Krachi West District, in the western part of the Oti Region of Ghana, adjacent to Lake Volta. Kete Krachi is connected by a ferry to the town of Kwadjokrom, and by road to Bimbila and Dambai. Kete Krachi is the seventy-second most populous settlement in Ghana, in terms of population, with a population of 11,788 people.

Climate 

 Notable residents 

 Joseph Kodzo

References

Populated places in the Oti Region